Ronald Gabe (1945 in Winnipeg, Manitoba – 1994) publicly known as Felix Partz, was a Canadian artist and cofounder of the artistic collective General Idea with Jorge Zontal and AA Bronson.

Partz tended toward the iconoclastic. While still at the University of Manitoba School of Art in Winnipeg he made photocopies of famous artworks for his print-making class. At the time of his death he had just finished work on a series of AIDS-related General Idea projects that incorporated mutated simulations of works by Piet Mondrian and Marcel Duchamp.

He died on June 5, 1994, of AIDS-related causes.

Canadian musician Peaches recorded a song entitled "Felix Partz" on her album The Teaches of Peaches.

References

1945 births
1994 deaths
AIDS-related deaths in Canada
Artists from Toronto
Artists from Winnipeg
Canadian mixed media artists
Canadian gay artists
Canadian contemporary artists
20th-century Canadian LGBT people